The University of Veterinary Sciences Brno (abbreviated VFU or VETUNI) is a public university located in Brno, Czech Republic.

In 2020, its Pharmaceutical Faculty was transferred to Masaryk University, and the reference to pharmacy was subsequently removed from the university's name in 2021.

Universities in the Czech Republic
Educational institutions established in 1918
Education in Brno
Organizations based in Brno
Buildings and structures in Brno
1918 establishments in Czechoslovakia